The Coxipi River is a salmon river in the Côte-Nord region of Quebec, Canada. It flows south through Quebec from Labrador and empties into the Gulf of Saint Lawrence.

Location

The river has a Strahler number of 6.
It is fed by Lake Poincarré.
The  Lake Coxipi is long and narrow, essentially a widening of the Coxipi River.
The mouth of the river is in the municipality of Saint-Augustin in Le Golfe-du-Saint-Laurent Regional County Municipality. 

Name

The 1914 and 1925 editions of the Dictionnaire des rivières et lacs de la province de Québec call the river Léandre River.
That name is said to come from a fisherman named Léandre who was based at its mouth for many years.
The 1921 Noms géographiques de la province de Québec gives Léandre River as the official name, and refers Coxipi River to Léandre River.
In 1948 the Quebec Geography Commission accepted Coxipi as the official name.
The name "Coxipi" comes from the Innu language name Kak Sipi, which means "porcupine river". 
Some sources say that coxipi means "sorcerer".

Description

The Dictionnaire des rivières et lacs de la province de Québec (1914) says of the Léandre River,

Basin

Of this  is in Labrador.
It lies between the basins of the Saint-Augustin River to the west and the Chécatica River to the east.
The Quebec portion is partly in the unorganized territory of Petit-Mécatina and partly in the municipality of Saint-Augustin.
The river basin include part of the proposed Basses Collines du Lac Guernesé Biodiversity Reserve.
This would protect the area from hydroelectric development.

Environment

A map of the ecological regions of Quebec shows the Coxipi River in sub-regions 6o-T, 6n-T and 6m-T of the east spruce/moss subdomain.
About 80.6% of the watershed is forest covered, with just 3.1% covered in shrubs or grassland.
9.6% of the watershed in water and 1.2% wetlands.
Land mammals include black bear, moose, boreal woodland caribou, wolf, lynx, beaver, North American porcupine, mink, hare and red fox.

Fishing

The Coxipi River is recognized as an Atlantic salmon river.
There are several fishing holes in the rapids at the river mouth.
Brook trout are also common.
The Pourvoirie Saint-Augustin, an outfitter accessible by boat or floatplane, provides fishing services over a  stretch.
The Pourvoirie Kecarpoui arranges fishing/camping expeditions that include the Véco, Kécarpoui, Saint-Augustin, Coxipi, Chécatica and Napetipi rivers.

Notes

Sources

Rivers of Côte-Nord